Curtia is a genus of flowering plants belonging to the family Gentianaceae.

Its native range is Southern Tropical America.

Species:

Curtia ayangannae 
Curtia conferta 
Curtia confusa 
Curtia diffusa 
Curtia intermedia 
Curtia malmeana 
Curtia obtusifolia 
Curtia patula 
Curtia pusilla 
Curtia tenuifolia 
Curtia verticillaris

References

Gentianaceae
Gentianaceae genera